Australia have competed in international rugby league matches since 1908. They  have appeared at every Rugby League World Cup, winning the tournament eleven times. The records listed below only include performances in test matches and internationals. The top five are listed in each category (except when there is a tie for the last place among the five, when all the tied record holders are noted).

Team records

Biggest wins

Biggest losses

Highest aggregate scores

Lowest aggregate scores

Individual records

Most appearances

Most appearances as captain

Most points

Most tries

Most goals

Most points in a game

Most tries in a game

Most goals in a game

Oldest players

Youngest players

Attendance records

Highest attendances in Australia

Highest attendances outside of Australia

Highest attendances per opponent

See also 

 List of results of the Australian national rugby league team

References

External links 

 Australia – Rugby League Project

Australia national rugby league team
Australian records
Rugby league records and statistics